Miss Israel is a national beauty pageant in Israel. The pageant was founded in 1950, where the winners were sent to Miss Universe. The pageant was also existing to send delegates to Miss World, Miss International, Miss Europe and Miss Asia Pacific International. The 1978 competition was held in Yad Eliyahu Arena, Tel Aviv. Dorit Jellinek was the winner.

Results

External links
Miss Israel 1978 (Hebrew)
Photo of Dorit Jellinek

1978 beauty pageants
1978 in Israel
Miss Israel
1970s in Tel Aviv